The men's 3000 metres steeplechase event at the 1963 Pan American Games was held at the Pacaembu Stadium in São Paulo on 30 April.

Results

References

Athletics at the 1963 Pan American Games
1963